The Balao halfbeak (Hemiramphus balao), occasionally called the Balao for short, is an ocean-going species of fish in the family Hemiramphidae. It was first described by the French naturalist Charles Alexandre Lesueur in 1821. They are used as cut bait and for trolling purposes by saltwater sportsmen.

Description
The Balao halfbeak is similar in appearance to its relative the ballyhoo (H. brasiliensis). The main difference between the two is that the distance from the nares to the base of the pectoral fin is greater than the length of the ballyhoo's pectoral fin, while that difference is less than the length of the Balao halfbeak's pectoral fin They have no spines on fins, but do have 11-15 rays of their dorsal fins and 10-13 rays on their anal fins. Balao halfbeak have blue-gray skin on their backs, while their undersides are silver or white. The longest recorded Balao halfbeak was 40 cm long.

Distribution and habitat
Balao halfbeak are found only in the Atlantic Ocean. In the west, they are known from New York south to Brazil, including much of the Gulf of Mexico and the Caribbean. In the eastern Atlantic, they are known from the Canary Islands and the Gulf of Guinea from Victoria, Nigeria to Luanda, Angola. Balao halfbeak have also been recorded from Côte d'Ivoire.

Balao halfbeak can form fairly large schools where they feed on smaller fishes and zooplankton. They can be found in both brackish and marine waters and are associated with reefs. Although they are mainly used by humans as baitfish for sailfish and marlin, they are also used as food in the West Indies. Balao halfbeak are also preyed upon by the brown noddy and the sooty tern.

References

McBride, Richard S., and Paul E. Thurman. 2003. Reproductive Biology of Hemiramphus brasiliensis and H. balao (Hemiramphidae): Maturation, Spawning Frequency, and Fecundity. Biol. Bull. 204: 57–67.

External links
Fishbase.org entry
Discoverlife.org entry
Encyclopedia of Life entry
ITIS entry

Balao halfbeak
Fish of the Atlantic Ocean
Taxa named by Charles Alexandre Lesueur
Fish described in 1821